Taekwondo events have been contested at every Asian Games since 1986 Games in Seoul, South Korea.

Editions

Medal table

List of medalists

External links 
Sports123

 
Sports at the Asian Games
Asian Games
Asian Games